This is a list of the annual winners of the Detroit Film Critics Society Award for Best Breakthrough Performance.

2010s
2017: Jordan Peele, Get Out
Timothée Chalamet
Gal Gadot
Tiffany Haddish. Girls Trip
Caleb Landry Jones
2018: Bo Burnham, Eighth Grade
Rafael Casal and Daveed Diggs, Blindspotting
Elsie Fisher, Eighth Grade
Lady Gaga, A Star Is Born
Boots Riley, Sorry to Bother You
2019: Florence Pugh
Ana de Armas, Knives Out
Jessie Buckley
Kaitlyn Dever
Aisling Franciosi, The Nightingale
Paul Walter Hauser
Lulu Wang, The Farewell
Olivia Wilde, Booksmart

2020s
2020: Maria Bakalova, Borat Subsequent Moviefilm
Jasmine Batchelor, The Surrogate
Radha Blank, The Forty-Year-Old Version
Orion Lee, First Cow
Wunmi Mosaku, His House

2021: Woody Norman, C'mon C'mon and Emma Seligman, Shiva Baby
Alana Haim, Licorice Pizza
Emilia Jones, CODA
Agathe Rousselle, Titane

References

Detroit Film Critics Society Awards